The Battle of Tsuntua, fought in December 1804, was one of the largest battles of the Fulani War.

Background 
In 1804, Yunfa of Gobir realized the growing threat that his former teacher, Fulani Islamic reformer Usman dan Fodio, posed to the Hausa city-states.  Appealing to the other Hausa rulers for help, Yunfa assembled an army to capture and kill Usman. Meanwhile, Usman's followers spread word of a jihad against the Hausa rulers, attracting a number of Fulani nomads to their cause, and declared Yunfa an infidel. In a dispute between them, Yunfa attempted to kill Usman, but his gun malfunctioned and only wounded his arm. Usman returned to the Fulani state of Gulu, where he raised a large army to crush the Hausa.

The Battle 
One of the first engagement of the war would be Tsuntua. Yunfa, possessing an army composed of Hausa warriors and Tuareg allies, defeated Dan Fodio's forces, which lost more than 2,000 to 3,000 men, 200 of whom were said to have been Hafiz (people who know the Koran by heart).

However, the Hausa victory proved to be short-lived, as Dan Fodio's forces seized Kebbi and Gwandu the following year, ensuring the survival and growth of their party.

References

"Usman dan Fodio."  Encyclopædia Britannica Online.

1804 in Africa
1804 in Nigeria
December 1804 events
Tsuntua
Tsuntua
Tsuntua